Playground is an album by drummer and composer Manu Katché released on the ECM label in 2007.

Reception

The Allmusic review by Thom Jurek says "Playground is an exciting new chapter in Katche's evolution as a leader; but more than this, bodes well for the future of jazz: it never loses sight of itself, but moves the various threads of its subgenres further without stretching any of them to the breaking point". In JazzTimes Jeff Tamarkin wrote "Manu Katché must be the least egotistical drummer on the planet. Although he’s rarely out of earshot on Playground, and the vision is clearly his, there’s not a moment when he hogs the spotlight ... most of the star turns go to the Norwegian hornmen, Trygve Seim on tenor and soprano saxophones and trumpeter Mathias Eick, and to the Polish pianist, Marcin Wasilewski. But they too keep things in check, and Playground, despite brief flashes of intensity, often teeters toward the smooth-jazz chasm—it never quite falls in, but it comes awfully close". On All About Jazz John Kelman noted "Playground is, like its predecessor, first and foremost an outstandingly honest record and proves, yet again, that accessible music needn't be lightweight or predictable".

Track listing 
All compositions by Manu Katché.
 "Lo" - 6:25
 "Pieces of Emotion" - 4:13
 "Song for Her" - 6:24
 "So Groovy" - 5:50
 "Morning Joy" - 5:27
 "Motion" - 5:14
 "Project 58" - 6:13
 "Snapshot" - 4:53
 "Possible Thought" - 6:03
 "Inside Game" - 5:06
 "Clubbing" - 7:03
 "Song for Her (Var.)" - 6:22

Personnel 
Manu Katché - drums
Mathias Eick - trumpet
Trygve Seim - tenor saxophone, soprano saxophone
Marcin Wasilewski - piano
 Slawomir Kurkiewicz - bass 
David Torn - guitar (tracks 1 & 12)

Production and design
Engineered by James A. Farber
Design by Sascha Kleis
Cover photo by Darius Khondji
Produced by Manfred Eicher

References 

ECM Records albums
Manu Katché albums
2007 albums
Albums produced by Manfred Eicher